Hood Green is a village in the metropolitan borough of Barnsley, South Yorkshire, England. It is near the villages of Dodworth and Silkstone and is within the Barnsley West and Penistone parliamentary constituency.

Wentworth Castle and gardens is a nearby tourist attraction.

References

External links

Villages in South Yorkshire
Geography of the Metropolitan Borough of Barnsley